Josiah Jude Emmanuel Dyer (born 24 September 2004) is an English professional footballer who plays as a forward for  club Barnsley. He is the son of former professional footballer Bruce Dyer.

Career
Dyer made his first-team debut for Barnsley on 11 October 2022, coming on for Slobodan Tedić as a 78th-minute substitute in a 4–2 win at Doncaster Rovers in an EFL Trophy group stage game.

Personal life
He is the son of former professional footballer Bruce Dyer.

Career statistics

References

2004 births
Living people
English people of Jamaican descent
Black British sportspeople
English footballers
Association football forwards
English Football League players
Barnsley F.C. players